The 1980 Santiago International Championships was a men's tennis tournament played on outdoor clay courts in Santiago, Chile that was part of the Grand Prix tennis circuit. It was the fifth edition of the tournament and was held from 24 November through 30 November 1980. Third-seeded Víctor Pecci won the singles title.

Finals

Singles
 Víctor Pecci defeated  Christophe Freyss 4–6, 6–4, 6–3
 It was Pecci's 1st singles title of the year and the 7th of his career.

Doubles
 Ricardo Ycaza /  Belus Prajoux defeated  Carlos Kirmayr /  João Soares 4–6, 7–6, 6–4

References

External links
 ITF tournament edition details

Chilean International
1980 in Chilean sport